Linda Karen Medlin is a molecular biologist known for her work on diatoms. She is an elected member of the Norwegian Academy of Science and Letters.

Education and career 
Medlin has a B.S. from the University of Texas at Austin (1970), and an M.S. (1977) and a Ph.D.(1983) from Texas A&M University. She has worked at the Alfred-Wegener-Institute in Germany (1991-2009), Observatoire océanologique de Banyuls-sur-Mer in France (2009-2013), and the company Microbia Environment in France (2013-2016). As of 2008, she is an associate research fellow at the Marine Biological Association.

Research 
Medlin's early work was with Greta Fryxell on the taxonomy of diatoms. She is known for her work on applying molecular tools to the study of phytoplankton, and she was the first to develop primers for polymerase chain reaction that targeted eukaryotic organisms, She applied this tool to taxonomic studies of multiple species of phytoplankton cultured in the laboratory. Her work extended into the ocean where she examined the diversity of phytoplankton in different regions including the Pacific Ocean, Antarctica,  and the time series from the German research station at Heligoland. Through the application of molecular tools, Medlin was able to define species differences in coccolithophores and examine the evolution of diatoms. In 2007, Medlin led the group who discovered a new lineage within photosynthetic eukaryotic organisms, the picobiliphytes, and then presented the first cultured strain in 2013 but the group is not photosynthetic but heterotrophic and feeds primarily on cryptomonads and may keep their plastids, hence the chartarcteristic pigments first associated with the group.. More recently. Medlin has worked on the phytoplankton within harmful algal blooms and improving methods for monitoring such blooms using DNA barcodes as probes in electrochemical biosensors.

Selected publications

Awards and honors 
Medlin was elected foreign member of Norwegian Academy of Science and Letters in 1998. Four of Medlin's papers have received awards, one paper received the Luigi Provasoli award from the Phycological Society of America, and three papers have received the Tyge Christensen Award from the International Phycological Society. Medlin received the Yasumoto Lifetime Achievement Award from the International Society for the Study of Harmful Algae in 2021.

References

External links 

 

University of Texas at Austin alumni
Texas A&M University alumni
Members of the Norwegian Academy of Science and Letters
Living people
Women molecular biologists
Women botanists
Year of birth missing (living people)